Calmidae is a taxonomic family of sea slugs with only one genus and two species. These are specifically aeolid nudibranchs. They are marine  gastropod molluscs in the superfamily Fionoidea.

This family has no subfamilies.

Taxonomic history
The genera in this family were moved to the family Fionidae as a result of a molecular phylogenetics study.

Biology
Species in this family have an unusual diet for Nudibranchs. They feed on fish eggs.

References

External links 

 Animal Diversity - University of Michigan
 Vaught, K.C. (1989). A classification of the living Mollusca. American Malacologists: Melbourne, FL (USA). . XII, 195 pp. 
 Marine species database
 Proc. malac. Soc. London 15: 200

 
Monogeneric mollusc families